Will Kraus (born 1994/1995) is an American shoegaze music producer.

Background 
Kraus grew up in Dallas. As a kid, he listened to Good Charlotte, and the Linkin Park fandom encouraged him to produce music, initially in hip-hop and electronic beats. Around 2010, he was introduced to Sigur Rós, "broadening his aesthetic scope", and he later discovered Odd Future, Danny Brown, and A$AP Rocky.

Around 2012, Kraus decided he wanted to pursue music as a career. He got an acceptance letter from the Clive Davis Institute of Recorded Music at New York University.

Career 
Kraus started working on his first album, End Tomorrow, in early 2016. After finishing it, he emailed several labels and music writers. Brian Justie from Terrible Records accepted to release the album. End Tomorrow was released on September 9. On September 28, a music video for the song "Pitch Fucker" was premiered by Stereogum.

Kraus released "Reach" as a single of his second album Path on February 7, 2018. The album's second single, "Bum", was released eleven days later. Path released on March 9. Ian Cohen of Pitchfork gave a 7.3/10 review. Chicago Reader Leor Galil also talked positively about the album. He released a music video for "Bum" on June 6. On the 28th, he released the single "More".

On July 8, 2021, Kraus released "Glass Valley" as a single of his upcoming third album, View No Country. He also released the singles "VNC", "Given" and "Redshift". The full album was released on October 22nd. On March 5, 2022, Kraus released Eye Escapes, a collection of recordings from 2016 to 2021, mostly from a lost album between Path and View No Country.

On February 27, 2023, Kraus released the EP Anything Else.

Musical style and legacy 
Kraus has been described as a noise rock, noise pop, dream pop and shoegaze musician and has been compared to My Bloody Valentine. Chris DeValle of Stereogum said that End Tomorrow is "a bombastic technicolor headfuck built from insane drums, celestial dreampop surges, and heavily processed vocals." Far Out Magazine Carly Wu elected Path as the 18th best shoegaze album of all time, declaring that it is "unfailingly one of the most brilliant contemporary shoegaze albums ever" and that it ascends "to pure perfection".

Discography 
Studio albums
End Tomorrow (2016)
Path (2018)
View No Country (2021)

Compilation albums
Eye Escapes (2022)

Extended plays
Anything Else (2023)

Singles
"Reach" (2018)
"Bum" (2018)
"More" (2018)
"Glass Valley" (2021)
"VNC" (2021)
"Given" (2021)
"Redshift" (2021)

Notes

References

External links 
Kraus on Bandcamp

Shoegaze musicians
American noise musicians
1990s births
Living people

Year of birth uncertain